Nebria adjarica is a species of black coloured ground beetle in the  Nebriinae subfamily that is endemic to Turkey.

References

Beetles described in 1983
Beetles of Asia
Endemic fauna of Turkey
adjarica